Catulle Mendès (22 May 1841 – 8 February 1909) was a French poet and man of letters.

Early life and career
Of Portuguese Jewish extraction, Mendès was born in Bordeaux. After childhood and adolescence in Toulouse, he arrived in Paris in 1859 and quickly became one of the protégés of the poet Théophile Gautier. He promptly attained notoriety with the publication in the La Revue fantaisiste (1861) of his Roman d'une nuit, for which he was condemned to a month's imprisonment and a fine of 500 francs. He was allied with Parnassianism from the beginning of the movement and displayed extraordinary metrical skill in his first volume of poems, Philoméla (1863). His critics have noted that the elegant verse of his later volumes is distinguished rather by dexterous imitation of different writers than by any marked originality. The versatility and fecundity of Mendès' talent is shown in his critical and dramatic writings, including several libretti, and in his novels and short stories. His short stories continue the French tradition of the licentious conte.

In his early period, Mendès sometimes published under the pseudonym Jacques Rollin.

Personal life

In 1866, Mendès married Judith Gautier, the younger daughter of his mentor Théophile. They soon separated, and in 1869 he began cohabiting with the composer Augusta Holmès with whom he had five children, including:
 Huguette Mendès (1871–1964)
 Claudine Mendès (1876–1937)
 Helyonne Mendès (1879–1955)
The couple parted in 1886, and he later married the poet Jeanne Nette, who was to be his last companion.

Death
Early on the morning of 8 February 1909, the body of Mendès was discovered in the railway tunnel of Saint Germain. He had left Paris by the midnight train on the 7th, and it is supposed that, thinking he had arrived at the station, he had opened the door of his compartment while still in the tunnel, although some biographers have suggested suicide. His body was interred at the Montparnasse Cemetery.

Works

Collections of poetry
 Philoméla (1863)
 Poésies, première série (1876), which includes much of his earlier verse
 Soirs moroses, Contes épiques, Philoméla, etc.; Poésies (7 vols., 1885), a new edition largely augmented
 Les Poésies de Catulle Mendès (3 vols., 1892)
 Nouveaux Contes de Jadis (1893), Editeur Paul Ollendorff, Paris
 La Grive des vignes (1895)

For theatre

 La Part du roi (1872), a one-act verse comedy
 Les Frères d'armes (1873), drama
 Justice (1877), in three acts, characterized by a hostile critic as a hymn in praise of suicide
 Le Capitaine Fracasse (1878), libretto of a light opera, based on Théophile Gautier's novel
 Gwendoline (1886) and Briséïs (1897), for the music of Chabrier
 La Femme de Tabarin (1887)
 Isoline (1888), for the music of Messager
 Médée (1898), in three acts and in verse
 La Reine Fiammette (1898), a conte dramatique in six acts and in verse, set in Renaissance Italy, later set to music by Xavier Leroux, for which see: La reine Fiammette
 Le Cygne (1899), for the music of Lecocq
 La Carmélite (1902), for the music of Reynaldo Hahn
 Le Fils de l'étoile (1904), the hero of which is Bar Kokhba, the Syrian pseudo-Messiah, for the music of Camille Erlanger
 Scarron (1905)
 Ariane (1906) and Bacchus (1909), for the music of Massenet
 Glatigny (1906)
 La Vierge d'Avila (1906), for Sarah Bernhardt
In the same year, Catulle Mendes wrote in Le Figaro that it was after reading the book of Gobineau "Les Religions et les Philosophies dans d´Asie centrale" that he had the idea to write a drama about the first woman disciple of the Báb: the persan erudite and illustrious poet Tahéreh (Táhirih)

Critical works

 Richard Wagner (1886)
 L'Art au théâtre (3 vols; 1896–1900), a series of dramatic criticisms reprinted from newspapers 
 A report addressed to the minister of public instruction and of the fine arts on Le Mouvement poétique francais de 1867 à 1900 (new ed., 1903), which includes a bibliographical and critical dictionary of the French poets of the 19th century.

Novels
 Zo'har (1886), a story of incest in which the woman is virile and the man is feeble
 Le Roi vierge (1880) in which he introduces Louis II of Bavaria and Richard Wagner
 L'Homme tout nu (1887)
Méphistophéla(1890) 
 La Maison de la vielle (1894)
 Gog (1897)

Documents
 L'Évangile de la jeunesse de Notre-Seigneur Jésus-Christ d'apres S. Pierre Mis En Francais Par Catulle Mendès Apres Le Manucrit De L'Abbaye De Saint Wolfgang'' (1894).  Presented as a lost Latin document from the abbey of St. Wolfgang im Salzkammergut, with a translation from Mendès to French, although considered a literary forgery entirely written by Mendès by most.

Books in English

References

External links

 
  
 
 Wagnerian Discord Echoed, The New York Times, June 10, 1894
 Web site in Spanish of Catulle Mendès

1841 births
1909 deaths
Writers from Bordeaux
19th-century French Sephardi Jews
19th-century French dramatists and playwrights
20th-century French dramatists and playwrights
19th-century French novelists
19th-century French poets
French opera librettists
Jewish poets
Railway accident deaths in France
Burials at Montparnasse Cemetery
French people of Portuguese-Jewish descent
French male poets
French male novelists
19th-century French male writers
20th-century French male writers